To learn is the act of acquiring knowledge.

Learn may also refer to:

 Ed Learn (born 1937), a Canadian football defensive back
 Learn: The Songs of Phil Ochs, a 2006 folk album
 Learn.com, a software company

See also

 LEARN (disambiguation)